And Then Came Love is a 2007 romantic comedy film directed by Richard Schenkman. It premiered at the Urban Film Series Festival in Washington, D.C. in June 2007, with a limited theatrical release in Ridgewood, New Jersey beginning in that same month along with a premiere in Manhattan, New York.

The film stars Vanessa Williams, Eartha Kitt (in her final film role), Kevin Daniels, Michael Boatman, Stephen Spinella, and Ben Vereen.

Plot
Julie (Vanessa Williams), a successful Manhattan reporter-turned-columnist in her mid-40s believes she has it all - a great job, a rent controlled apartment, a boyfriend (Michael Boatman) and best of all, an adorable six-year-old son named Jake, whom she conceived via an anonymous sperm donor.  Her perfect world, however, is rocked when she’s called in for an emergency parent-teacher conference and learns that her son has been acting up, needs to be ‘tested,’ and is on the brink of expulsion.

Overwhelmed, Julie instinctively blames herself easily since her mother (Eartha Kitt) has made her feel inadequate for not being a stay-at-home mom.  Julie, however, will not concede that her mother could be right, so she places genetic blame on Jake’s anonymous father.  Through a private investigator, Julie learns the identity of the donor and meets him – Paul (Kevin Daniels), a struggling actor and law school dropout.

Julie has neither intention nor desire to reveal her identity to him, she simply needs to check her sources, get the facts, and move on.  Jake instantly bonds with Paul, however, and no matter how hard Julie tries to keep Paul from complicating her life, the more he begins to fall for her, and she finds she too is falling badly for him even while her boyfriend is pushing to set a wedding date.

Cast
 Vanessa Williams as Julie
 Kevin Daniels	as Paul
 Michael Boatman as Ted
 Jeremy Gumbs as Jake
 Eartha Kitt as Mona
 Tommy Nelson as Horatio
 Stephen Spinella as Stuart
 Eileen Alana as Miss Missy
Rest of cast listed alphabetically:
 Collin Biddle as Maitre' D (credited as Colin Biddle)
 Anna Camp as Kikki
 Courtney Carter as Park Nanny
 Mike Colter as Yuppie Paul
 Peter Conboy as Man on Street
 Andrea Darriau as Jittery Woman

External links
 
 
And Then Came Love at the Internet Movie Database

2007 films
2007 romantic comedy films
Films shot in New York City
Films shot in New Jersey
Films directed by Richard Schenkman
American romantic comedy films
2000s English-language films
2000s American films